Total Eclipse Anthology is a compilation album by Welsh singer Bonnie Tyler released in January 2002 by Sanctuary Records. The two-disc collection features songs from all of Tyler's previous record labels including RCA, CBS, Hansa and EastWest.

Two years after the Total Eclipse Anthology was released, following the success of Tyler's single "Si demain.. (Turn Around)" with Kareen Antonn, the compilation entered the French Compilation Chart and the Mid-Price Albums charts, peaking at no. 36 and no. 25 respectively.

Background 
The Total Eclipse Anthology was compiled and annotated by Gerald Armin, who also wrote the liner notes for Tyler's other compilations Greatest Hits (2001) and Lost in France: The Early Years (2005). It features Tyler's debut single "My! My! Honeycomb" which had not previously appeared on any album since its standalone release in 1976. The compilation features a slipcase cover art with a photograph of Tyler taken by David Hurn in October 2001. The cover art for the CD booklet features an image taken for Tyler's album Secret Dreams and Forbidden Fire in 1986.

Critical reception 

James Christopher Monger of AllMusic gave the compilation four out of five stars, describing the Total Eclipse Anthology as suitable for listeners who are "looking to dig deeper into Tyler's career".

Track listing

Charts

Personnel
Credits adapted from liner notes.

Gerald Armin – liner notes, compilation of tracks
Steve Hammonds – project coordination
Hugh Gilmour – art direction
Albert de Gouviea – slipcase photo retouching
Alwyn Clayden – inner package design

References

Bonnie Tyler compilation albums
2002 compilation albums